Rahbar is the common name for the Supreme Leader of Iran. It may also refer to:

People

First name
Rahbar Wahed Khan, Bangladeshi footballer

Other uses
Rahbar (newspaper), Iranian newspaper
Supreme Leader of Afghanistan

See also
Murderaz-e Rahbar, village in Kohgiluyeh and Boyer-Ahmad Province, Iran